Maurice Lusien (17 August 1926 – 10 March 2017) was a French swimmer who competed in the 1948 Summer Olympics and in the 1952 Summer Olympics.

References

1926 births
2017 deaths
French male butterfly swimmers
French male breaststroke swimmers
Olympic swimmers of France
Swimmers at the 1948 Summer Olympics
Swimmers at the 1952 Summer Olympics
World record setters in swimming
European Aquatics Championships medalists in swimming
Mediterranean Games medalists in swimming
Mediterranean Games gold medalists for France
Swimmers at the 1951 Mediterranean Games
Swimmers at the 1955 Mediterranean Games
20th-century French people
21st-century French people